Agneta Ekmanner (born 4 December 1938) is a Swedish actress. She has appeared in more than 50 films and television shows since 1965.

Selected filmography

 Love 65 (1965)
 Hugs and Kisses (1967)
 The Corridor (1968)
 Per (1975)
 Paradise Place (1977)
 The Mozart Brothers (1986)
 Lethal Film (1988)
 Svart Lucia (1992)
 Murder at the Savoy (1993)
 Roseanna (1993)
 The Fire Engine That Disappeared (1993)
 The Police Murderer (1994)
 In the Presence of a Clown (1997)
 The Honour of the House (1999)
 White Water Fury (2000)

References

External links

1938 births
Living people
20th-century Swedish actresses
21st-century Swedish actresses
Swedish film actresses
Swedish television actresses
Best Actress Bodil Award winners
Actresses from Stockholm